Malade may refer to:

 Mălădia [ro] (Hungarian Maladé), a village in Măeriște, Romania
 "Malade", a single by pop music band Rational Youth

See also 
 Malad